The following entries cover events related to the study of anthropology which occurred in the listed year.

1800s-1900s
1870-1879
1880-1889
1890-1899
1900-1909
1910-1919
1920-1929
1930-1939
1940-1949
1950-1959
1960-1969
1970-1979
1980-1989
1990-1999

2000s-
2000-2009
2010-2019

See also
 List of years in philosophy
 List of years in archaeology
 List of years in literature
 List of years in art

Please see the WikiProject page for formatting standards.

Anthropology
Anthropology
Anthropology